Pedro Domingo Murillo is a province in the Bolivian La Paz Department. It was created on January 8, 1838, with the name Cercado and on October 17, 1912, during the presidency of Eliodoro Villazón, its name was changed in honor of Pedro Domingo Murillo, protagonist of the revolution of June 16, 1809.

The province contains the Bolivian administrative capital, La Paz, as well as the major city of El Alto.

Geography 
The Cordillera Real traverses the province. Illimani, the highest peak of the range, lies in the province. Other mountains are listed below:

Subdivision 
Pedro Domingo Murillo Province is divided into five municipalities.

Places of interest 
Some of the tourist attractions of the municipality are:
 In the La Paz Municipality:
 Wayna Potosí, a mountain about 15 km north west of La Paz
Qutapata National Park and Integrated Management Natural Area
 La Cumbre at a height of 4,650 m above sea level, the highest point on the route between La Paz and the Yungas
 K'ili K'ili viewpoint which presents a panoramic view of the city of La Paz
 Muela del Diablo ("devil' tooth"), a giant rock of about 150 m height that has the shape of a tooth
 Valle de la Luna ("moon valley"), south of La Paz city
 La Paz zoo "Vesty Pakos Sofra" with an area of 22.4 ha, the largest zoo in Bolivia, the second largest in South America and the highest in the world.
 Inkachaka Dam
 In the Palca Municipality:
 Apachita viewpoint in the Palca Canton which offers a sight of the contrasting landscape and snowcapped Illimani
 Valle de los Ánimas ("valley of the souls") and its lake (Laguna de las Ánimas) in the Palca Canton
 the town of Palca with houses of colonial times, Palca River, Chuaqueri gorge, also known as Palca gorge, and Takesi pre-Columbian trail in the Palca Canton
 the communities of Quilihuaya and Pinaya in the Quilihuaya Canton
 the community of Cohoni, its church dating from the 17th century and the chullpa of Ch'ullu Cahinbaya in the Cohoni Canton

See also 
 Ch'uxña Quta
 Jach'a Quta
 Janq'u Quta
 Laram Quta (El Alto)
 Laram Quta (La Paz)
 Milluni Lake

References 

Provinces of La Paz Department (Bolivia)